Talking past each other is an English phrase describing the situation where two or more people talk about different subjects, while believing that they are talking about the same thing.

David Horton writes that when characters in fiction talk past each other, the effect is to expose "an unbridgeable gulf between their respective perceptions and intentions. The result is an exchange, but never an interchange, of words in fragmented and cramped utterances whose subtext often reveals more than their surface meaning."

The phrase is used in widely varying contexts. For example, in 1917, Albert Einstein and David Hilbert had dawn-to-dusk discussions of physics; and they continued their debate in writing, although Felix Klein records that they "talked past each other, as happens not infrequently between simultaneously producing mathematicians."

See also
 Essentially contested concept

Notes

References
 Anderson, Philip Warren.  "Twenty years of talking past each other: The theory of high Tc," Physica C: Superconductivity and its Applications, v. 460–462, iss. 0, p. 3-6.
 Gutting, Gary. (1980). Paradigms and Revolutions: Appraisals and Applications of Thomas Kuhn's Philosophy of Science. South Bend, Indiana: University of Notre Dame Press. OCLC 163461098

English phrases
Heuristics